The 1974 Oklahoma Sooners football team represented the University of Oklahoma in the 1974 NCAA Division I football season.  This was the first of three national championship squads for head coach Barry Switzer. Only one opponent played the Sooners within 14 points and four failed to score a touchdown. At the same time, OU led the nation in scoring offense with an average of 43 points per game to finish the season as the only undefeated team in the country at 11–0.

Schedule

Season summary
Oklahoma was loaded with talent, evidenced by its eight All-Americans, the most of any season to that point.  OU's wishbone offense, triggered by running back Joe Washington, fullback Jim Littrell, and quarterback Steve Davis, averaged 73.9 rushing attempts per game, which still stands as an NCAA single-season record, as does its 21.4 rushing first downs per game.
 
Oklahoma also featured a tough defense led by senior All-American Rod Shoate, a swift and punishing linebacker, and a defensive front consisting of brothers Lee Roy and Dewey Selmon, and Jimbo Elrod. 
 
Because Oklahoma was on NCAA probation for recruiting violations, it was ineligible for ranking in the Coaches Poll and could not appear on network television or appear in a postseason bowl game. Nevertheless, the Sooners opened the '74 season as the top-ranked team in the AP Poll, the first time since 1957 that OU debuted at #1 and the first time in 11 years that Oklahoma sat atop the poll.  Despite being a 43-point favorite against Baylor, the Sooners struggled in their season opener, needing three fourth-quarter touchdowns to secure a 28–11 victory. Baylor recovered from this loss and enjoyed a stellar season, winning the Southwest Conference championship under third-year coach Grant Teaff.

The win didn't impress AP voters, and OU dropped to #3 behind Ohio State and Notre Dame.  The Sooners quickly rebounded by destroying Utah State and Wake Forest in back-to-back weeks by a combined score of 135–3. Eight Sooners scored touchdowns against Utah State, while nine players found the end zone against the Demon Deacons.

Next up for the Sooners was the Red River Shootout, and the Texas Longhorns presented Oklahoma's toughest challenge yet.  Trailing 13–7 in the fourth quarter, OU dug into its bag of tricks with a reverse to split end Billy Brooks, who scampered 40 yards down the sideline for a touchdown. The ensuing extra point attempt by Sooner kicker John Carroll was ruled no good, leaving the game tied at 13–13.   Oklahoma's defense rose to the challenge, led by Shoate, who finished the game with 21 tackles, two pass breakups, a forced fumble, and a fumble recovery. The last statistic was the critical one, as the Sooners forced a Texas fumble on the next possession, which Shoate recovered at the 50. A 37–yard field goal from Tony DiRienzo minutes later was the difference.  "This was as close as a game can be", coach Switzer said afterward. A testament to how hard the game was fought, OU offensive tackle Mike Vaughan reportedly passed out from exhaustion following the game.
 
The Sooners followed their victory over Texas with a pair of blowouts over #16 Colorado, 49-14, and Kansas State, 63–0. Joe Washington rushed for 200 yards and four touchdowns against the Buffaloes, while eight players found the end zone versus the Wildcats.  After a sloppy performance on a soggy field in a 28–10 win at Iowa State, Oklahoma shutout a tough Missouri squad 37–0, a team that had beaten Nebraska and scored 82 points in its previous two games. OU's third shutout of the season ran its record to 8–0 as top-ranked Ohio State was upset by Michigan State, 16–13.
 
Oklahoma regained the #1 ranking and, following a 45–14 win over Kansas, traveled to Lincoln with a Big Eight Conference title on the line.  OU changed its defense for the game against Nebraska, using man-to-man coverage instead of zone. The move paid dividends as the Sooners intercepted four passes, including three by Randy Hughes, while the offense rolled up 482 yards on the ground despite not completing a single pass in the contest. The victory earned Oklahoma its second straight Big Eight Championship with one game remaining against Oklahoma State.  Against the Cowboys, OU faced a 13–10 deficit late in the third quarter before scoring five touchdowns during a seven–and–a–half–minute span. The 44–13 victory marked OU's 20th consecutive win and 29th straight game without a loss. 
 
When Alabama fell to Notre Dame in the Orange Bowl, the Sooners were left as the nation's only unbeaten team.  With a #1 ranking in the final AP Poll, OU laid claim to its fourth national championship and first since 1956. To date, the 1974 Sooners are the last NCAA Division I-A team to claim an AP national title without benefit of a postseason bowl win.

Game summaries

Wake Forest

Texas (Red River Shootout)

Colorado

Personnel

Rankings

Postseason

NFL draft
The following players were drafted into the National Football League following the season.

References

Oklahoma
Oklahoma Sooners football seasons
College football national champions
Big Eight Conference football champion seasons
College football undefeated seasons
Oklahoma Sooners football